François Jean Dégerine (31 March 1870 – 26 March 1948) was a Swiss footballer and manager.

Playing career
Dégerine took up football, joining Geneva-based club Stellula in the 1890s, after playing rugby and being a part of the Bicycle-Club Genève cycling club. In 1897, Dégerine joined Servette, helping the club transition from rugby to football. Dégerine left Servette in 1903.

Managerial career
Dégerine became Switzerland's first official manager in 1908, following the Swiss Football Association's management of the team. Over the course of little over a year, Dégerine managed Switzerland four times, winning once and losing three times.

References

Footballers from Geneva
1870 births
1948 deaths
Association footballers not categorized by position
Swiss men's footballers
Swiss male cyclists
Switzerland national football team managers
Swiss football managers
Servette FC players
19th-century Swiss people
20th-century Swiss people